Tetracus is an extinct genus of gymnures. Species are from the Oligocene of Belgium and France. Fossils can also be found in the Bouldnor Formation in the Hampshire Basin of southern England.

Species:
 †Tetracus nanus (Aymard, 1846)
 synonym Erinaceus nanus Aymard, 1846
 synonym Camphotherium elegans Filhol, 1883, Filhol, 1884
 synonym Comphotherium elegans Filhol, 1884, Filhol 1885
 synonym Gomphotherium elegans Filhol, 1884 in Schlosser, 1887, p. 140 and 465 and in Lavocat, 1951, p. 14
 synonym Neurogymnurus minor Filhol, 1884
 synonym Necrogymnurus minor in Lavocat, 1951, p. 13 
 synonym Tetracus bouti Lavocat, 1951, dans Lavocat, 1951.

References

External links 
 

Prehistoric placental genera
Erinaceidae